is a Japanese astronomer who discovered an asteroid in 1983.

He is credited by the Minor Planet Center with the discovery of 2909 Hoshi-no-ie, a main-belt asteroid of the Eos family, which he named after his observatory. The meaning of "Hoshi-no-ie" is "a star house". Naming citation was published on 17 February 1984.

References 
 

Discoverers of asteroids
20th-century Japanese astronomers
Possibly living people
Year of birth missing